Deep River Center is a census-designated place (CDP) comprising the primary village in the town of Deep River, Middlesex County, Connecticut, United States. It is in the east-central part of the town, bordered to the north by the town of Chester, to the south by the town of Essex, to the east by Pratt Cove, and to the northeast by the Connecticut River. As of the 2020 census, Deep River Center had a population of 2,765, out of 4,415 in the entire town of Deep River.

References 

Census-designated places in Middlesex County, Connecticut
Census-designated places in Connecticut